The Sami knife (Sami: stuorraniibi = "big knife") is a large knife traditionally used by the Sami people.

The Sami knife has a long, wide, and strong blade that is suited for light chopping tasks such as de-limbing, cutting small trees for shelter  poles (See lavvu), brush clearing, bone breaking and butchering tasks, and is sometimes used as a substitute for an axe for chopping and splitting small amounts of firewood from standing dead trees—an essential ability when all dead and fallen wood is buried underneath many layers of snow—or for combat.

The handle is generally made from birch for better grip when used in snowy conditions. This also provides good control over the blade, particularly when using draw strokes, which are preferred when handling the knife with gloves, or while the hands are numb. The tang runs through the handle. The handle has no crossguard. Traditional material for the sheath is reindeer leather.

The blade's edge often has a Scandinavian (or "Scandi") grind, i.e. a single flat bevel. The blade should be strong enough to split (reindeer) bones, and tempered to sustain low temperatures. Some Sami knives have fullers.

The Sami people typically use two knives: the smaller called a buiku, puukko, or unna niibaš ("small knife"); while the larger "Sami knife" is called stuorra niibi ("big knife"). An even larger version known as a väkipuukko (or sax) is similar to a seax, named after the Saxons.

See also 
Puukko
Yakutian knife
Seax

References 

Knives
Blade weapons
Camping equipment
Finnish culture
Sámi culture